The Book of Life is a 1998 film directed by Hal Hartley. In the film, Jesus returns to earth on the eve of the new millennium planning to bring about the apocalypse, but finds himself surprisingly enamored of humanity. It stars Martin Donovan as Jesus, PJ Harvey as Mary Magdalene, and Thomas Jay Ryan as The Devil. Yo La Tengo appear as a Salvation Army band.

Production
The film was made for the 2000, Seen By... project, initiated by the French company Haut et Court to produce films depicting the approaching turn of the millennium seen from the perspectives of 10 different countries.

References

 ABC Limelight magazine, July 2005, quoting Hartley on the D. W. Griffith reference.

External links

1998 films
Films about Christianity
1998 comedy films
Films directed by Hal Hartley
American avant-garde and experimental films
American comedy films
1990s avant-garde and experimental films
Yo La Tengo
1990s English-language films
1990s American films